"Jack of all trades, master of none" is a figure of speech used in reference to a person who has dabbled in many skills, rather than gaining expertise by focusing on only one.

The original version "a jack of all trades" is often used as a compliment for a person who is good at fixing and has a good level of broad knowledge.  They may be a master of integration: an individual who knows enough from many learned trades and skills to be able to bring the disciplines together in a practical manner.  This person is a generalist rather than a specialist.

Origins 

Robert Greene used the phrase "absolute Johannes Factotum" (rather than "Jack of all trades") in his 1592 booklet Greene's Groats-Worth of Wit, to dismissively refer to actor-turned-playwright William Shakespeare; this is the first published mention of Shakespeare.

Some scholars believe Greene was referring not to Shakespeare, but to "Resolute" Johannes Florio, known as John Florio.  They have pointed out how "Johannes" was the Latin version of John (Giovanni), and the name by which Florio was known among his contemporaries.  The term "absolute" is thought to be a rhyme for the nickname used by Florio in his signature ("resolute"), and the term "factotum" is thought to be used as a disparaging word for secretary, John Florio's job.

In 1612, the phrase appeared in the book "Essays and Characters of a Prison" by English writer Geffray Mynshul (Minshull), originally published in 1618, and was probably based on the author's experience while held at Gray's Inn, London, when imprisoned for debt.

"Master of none" 
The "master of none" element appears to have been added in the late 18th century; it made the statement less flattering to the person receiving it.  Today, "Jack of all trades, master of none" generally describes a person whose knowledge, while covering a number of areas, is superficial in all of them.  When abbreviated as simply "jack of all trades", it is an ambiguous statement – the user's intention is then dependent on context.  However, when "master of none" is added (sometimes in jest), this is unflattering. In the United States and Canada, the phrase has been in use since 1721.

"Full quotation" 

In modern times, the phrase with the "master of none" element is sometimes expanded into a less unflattering couplet by adding a second line: "but oftentimes better than master of one" (or variants thereof), with some writers saying that such a couplet is the "original" version with the second line having been dropped, but there are no known instances of this second line dated to before the twenty-first century.

See also 
 Amateur
 Competent man
 Generalist (disambiguation)
 Multipotentiality
 Philomath
 Polymath

References

External links 

English-language idioms
Jack tales